Touch is a 1997 film written and directed by Paul Schrader. It is based on a 1987 novel by Elmore Leonard.

The film, which has elements of drama and black comedy, stars Christopher Walken, Richard Schiff, Bridget Fonda, Skeet Ulrich, Tom Arnold, Gina Gershon, Lolita Davidovich, Janeane Garofalo and Paul Mazursky. It was shot in Fullerton, California.

The soundtrack of the movie was composed and recorded by Dave Grohl, and released on his Capitol Records imprint, Roswell Records.  Nine of the tracks are instrumental.  The remaining four tracks feature lyrics.  One has Dave Grohl on vocals titled "How Do You Do," one has John Doe on vocals titled "This Loving Thing", and the other two songs titled "Touch" and "Saints in Love" feature vocals from Dave Grohl and Louise Post of Veruca Salt.  The release would also mark the first time Grohl used his pseudonym Late, as credited in the liner notes, since the release of Pocketwatch in 1992.

Plot
A young man, Juvenal, is apparently able to cure the sick by the laying-on of hands. Mysterious stigmata appear from time to time on his flesh.

The former evangelist Bill Hill, tired of selling mobile homes for a living, persuades his friend Lynn Faulkner to befriend the innocent ex-monk and encourage him to aim for the big-time. But matters become complicated when the young couple falls in love, and even more complicated when fundamentalist August Murray takes exception to their relationship.

Cast
 Skeet Ulrich as Juvenal
 Bridget Fonda as Lynn
 Christopher Walken as Bill Hill
 Gina Gershon as Debra
 Tom Arnold as August Murray
 Conchata Ferrell as Virginia Worrel
 William Newman as Court Clerk
 Julie Condra as Shelly
 Brent Hinkley as Arnold

Reception

References

External links
 

1997 films
American satirical films
1997 comedy films
Films based on American novels
Films directed by Paul Schrader
Films based on works by Elmore Leonard
Films with screenplays by Paul Schrader
United Artists films
1990s English-language films
1990s American films